Jeffrey Daniel Dominic James (né Walker; born 11 March 1968) is a British public servant and executive, and former Royal Navy sailor. Since 2014, he has been Chief executive and Keeper of The National Archives.

Early life and education
James was born on 11 March 1968 in Solihull, West Midlands, England. His surname at birth was Walker, but it was changed to James when he was later adopted by Edwin and Edith James. From 1979 to 1984, he was educated at Park View Comprehensive School in Chester-le-Street, County Durham.

James did not attend university straight after leaving school. Later, he studied for a degree with the Open University, a part-time distance learning university, and graduated with a Bachelor of Science in 2001. He studied history as a postgraduate at the University of Hertfordshire, completing his Master of Arts degree in 2010.

Career

Military service
In 1984, James joined the Royal Navy as a rating. He trained as an electronic engineer, and specialised as a Weapons Engineering Artificer. He worked on the Resolution-class and Vanguard-class submarines, which operate the Polaris and Trident nuclear programmes respectively. In 1992, he was promoted to chief petty officer. He left the navy in September 1998 after 14 years of service.

Public service
After leaving the Royal Navy, James joined the University of Leeds as an IT technical support officer. He was later appointed Network Group Manager. From 2003 to 2004 he was operations manager of Swift Research Ltd, a Yorkshire-based market research agency. In 2004, he joined the British Library and worked in various operations management positions for the next three years. He ended his time at the British Library as Head of Operations.

In 2007, James joined The National Archives as Director of Operations and Services. From June 2013 to July 2014 he was Deputy Chief executive of the Chartered Institute of Housing, and was "responsible for leading on strategy development, operational excellence, business performance and change management". In May 2014, he was announced as the next Chief executive and Keeper of The National Archives. He took up the appointment on 29 July 2014.

Personal life
In 2010, James married Joanne Knight. Together they have three sons, including a set of twins.

References

1968 births
Living people
British civil servants
British chief executives
People associated with The National Archives (United Kingdom)
British electronics engineers
Royal Navy sailors
People from Solihull
Alumni of the Open University
Alumni of the University of Hertfordshire
British adoptees